Estherville–Lincoln Central Community School District (ELC) is a rural public school district headquartered in Estherville, Iowa.

The district covers most of central and western Emmet County, along with a small part of eastern Dickinson County. In addition to Estherville it serves the communities of Dolliver, Gruver, Wallingford, and most of Superior.

It was established on July 1, 1997, by the merger of the Estherville and Lincoln Central school districts. The district serves a total population of approximately 8,800.

Schools
The district maintains three traditional schools, all of which are located on a single campus in Estherville:
 Demoney Elementary School                       grades PK–4
 Estherville–Lincoln Central Middle School       grades 5–8
 Estherville–Lincoln Central High School         grades 9–12
     
Besides the traditional schools the district runs Forest Ridge School, which is an alternative high school serving clients of a residential treatment program for troubled adolescents. It is located in Gruver at the former Lincoln Central School campus.  The district also maintains the Regional Wellness Center which is located just south of the district campus.

Estherville–Lincoln Central High School

Athletics
Estherville–Lincoln Central's athletic program inherited the nickname, colors, traditions and history of Estherville High School. The high school's athletic teams, nicknamed the Midgets compete in the Lakes Conference in the following sports:

Baseball
Basketball 
 Boys' 1987 Class 2A state champions
 Girls' 1982 6 on 6 state champions 
 Girls' 2022 Class 3A state champions
Cross country 
Football
Golf 
 Boys' - two-time state champions (1974, 1981)
Soccer 
Softball
Swimming 
Tennis
Track and field 
Volleyball
Wrestling

See also
List of school districts in Iowa
List of high schools in Iowa

References

Further reading
 Adopted Budget Summary 2017 from the Iowa Department of Education

External links
 Estherville–Lincoln Central Community School District
 Forest Ridge School

School districts in Iowa
Education in Emmet County, Iowa
Education in Dickinson County, Iowa
1997 establishments in Iowa
School districts established in 1997